Samuel Hutt, known by the stage name Hank Wangford (born 15 November 1940), is an English country and western songwriter.

"Hank is a good smoke screen. He can do things I can't do. He's my clown," says Dr. Hutt, who has been struggling to balance his musical and medical interests ever since medical school at Cambridge University. His 1960s practice in a drug-addiction centre brought him into contact with a lot of rockers and wide renown as London's long-haired, rock-and-roll doctor, and later a television series. "If The Who had a first night, the tickets would be sent. I actually had more of an identity crisis with that than with Hank, because Hank is a fool. I quite like him. Dr. Sam was definitely threatening to become a monster."

Early and personal life
It has been said that Hank was born in Wangford, Suffolk, England. and that may be where Sam Hutt conceived his stage name. In his appearance in the film, A Brief History of Brocket Hall, Sam Hutt says that he was born in an upstairs room at Brocket Hall, Hertfordshire, on the night from 14 to 15 November 1940, during The Blitz. It was a forceps delivery. As he  describes in the film, Brocket Hall has a history of sexual scandals, involving the royal family and politicians but, by 1940, it had become a maternity home. The British Government had intelligence that the Germans were planning to flatten London on the night of the birth, when there was to be a full moon (The "Hunter Moon" or "Blood Moon") which would provide good visibility. His mother was therefore evacuated to Hertfordshire for the birth. In the event, on the night of the birth the Germans bombed Coventry, not London. His father was the journalist and communist activist Allen Hutt.

He studied medicine at Cambridge University and eventually became a doctor.

His first writing credit (as Sam Hutt) was on a Sarah Miles 1965 single "Where Am I". His first recording was credited as Boeing Duveen & The Beautiful Soup with "Jabberwock"/"Which Dreamed It", issued on UK Parlophone R 5696 in May 1968. He is co-credited as the writer as "Sam Hutt" on both sides together with Lewis Carroll, with whose words the songs are adapted. Hutt's family background is radical: his father Allen (a journalist and expert on the history of printing) was a lifelong Communist. During the NUM miners strike in 1984/85, the Hank Wangford Band toured extensively with Billy Bragg and the Frank Chickens as "Hank, Frank and Billy" performing at trade-union benefit and anti-racist gigs. It was during such a benefit for the Greater London Council (GLC) in 1984 that Hank and the band were attacked on stage by a group of right-wing skinheads, an event that has been immortalised in the song "On The Line".

The Hank Wangford Band
A chance meeting with former Byrds member Gram Parsons, who played him the song "You're Still on My Mind" (from the album Sweetheart of the Rodeo), led him to country music.

The 1984 Edinburgh Festival Fringe saw the Hank Wangford Band achieve some acclaim, with their show being nominated for the Perrier Award. Fringe Sunday also saw the importation to Edinburgh of the sport of cow-pat flinging. Unfortunately, this required hard cow-pats as an essential part of the process. BBC Radio 1 DJ Andy Kershaw had to put out an appeal for cow-pats, which later had to be dried in a microwave oven for them to work successfully.

No Hall Too Small
Wangford has also toured with Reg Meuross and with Andy Roberts on the "No Hall Too Small" tour of village halls throughout the UK as part of the Arts Council-funded National Rural Touring Forum (NRTF).

Writing career
Wangford has written an occasional series of travel articles for The Guardian newspaper and is president of the "Nude Mountaineering Society".

Discography 
Hank Wangford, Cow Pie Records (COW 1), 1980
Hank Wangford - Wild Thing c/w All I Want, Cow Pie Records (PIE001), 1980 (7")
Hank Wangford - Cowboys Stay On Longer c/w Whisky On My Guitar, Cow Pie Records (PIE002), 1980 (7")
Hank Wangford - Cowboys Stay On Longer c/w Whisky On My Guitar, WEA (K18712), 1980 (7")
The Hank Wangford Band Live, Cow Pie Records (COW 2), 1982
The Hank Wangford Band, Rodeo Radio, Situation Two (SITU 16), 1985
The Hank Wangford Band, Cowboys Stay On Longer, Sincere Sounds (Honky 1X), 1987 (12")
The Hank Wangford Band, Cowboys Stay On Longer, Sincere Sounds (Honky 1A-DJ), 1987 (7")

CDs
Hank Wangford - Cowboys Stay On Longer, Reissue Albums One and Two, Sincere Sounds, 2001
Hank Wangford - Stormy Horizons, Sincere Sounds, 1990
Hank Wangford & The Lost Cowboys - Hard Shoulder To Cry On, Live Album Sincere Sounds, 1993
Hank Wangford & The Lost Cowboys - Wake Up Dead, Sincere Sounds, 1997
Hank Wangford & The Lost Cowboys - Best Foot Forward, Sincere Sounds, 2003
Hank Wangford & The Lost Cowboys - Whistling In The Dark, Sincere Sounds, 2008
Hank Wangford & The Lost Cowboys - Save Me The Waltz, (Double Album) Sincere Sounds, 2014
Hank Wangford - Holey Holey, Sincere Sounds, 2020

Cassettes
The Hank Wangford Band Bumper Box, Cow Pie Records (CCP1), 1981
The Hank Wangford Band - Rootin' Tootin' Santa Claus, Cow Pie Records (CCP2), 1982

Bibliography
Hank Wangford Volume III The Middle Years as told to Sam Hutt, Pan London 1989, 
Lost Cowboys From Patagonia to the Alamo by Hank Wangford. Orion Cassell 1997

References

External links

Independent.co.uk
Short profile at OpenLearn 

1940 births
20th-century English medical doctors
Charisma Records artists
English country guitarists
English country singer-songwriters
Living people
People from Wangford
Situation Two artists